"Gold Dust" is a song by British-based DJ and record producer DJ Fresh. It is the third single released from his second album Kryptonite.

Originally put out as a 12" in 2008, it was re-released in 2010 featuring vocals from Ce'cile although there is a version of the song on his album Nextlevelism which features Ms. Dynamite. The 2010 version of the song peaked at number 24 on the UK Singles Chart. The music video was directed by Ben Newman and edited by Jacek Zajkowski. In 2012, Shy FX made a 're-edit' of the song that was re-released to radio. This version reached number 22 on the UK Singles Chart and number 39 on the Irish Singles Chart.

The sales of all versions are combined enabling it to have sold in excess of 600,000 copies, receiving a Platinum certification, despite never reaching the top twenty of the UK Singles Chart.

Music video 
The official music video was filmed at the Brownsville Project in Brooklyn and captures some performances by American Double Dutch champions, Jumpers in Command. The youths are seen doing various activities including skateboarding, skipping, and free running.

Critical reception 
Fraser McAlpine of BBC Chart Blog gave the song a positive review stating:

Sometimes the brightest gems are right in front of your eyes, hiding in plain sight. Or just obscured by people who know they are there, but have forgotten to tell you.

With this song, and its fantastic video, I will admit that my attention was miles away, probably raking through some slower, drabber, less fun things (ie: ANYTHING ELSE). I had no idea something this ker-ay-zee, this life-affirming, this astonishingly chipper was released across on my beloved internet just seven days ago, until a friend dragged me over to look at what he called "the skipping video" on his phone.

Yeah, that's right, a skipping video. I mean how impressive can a video which features people either successfully or unsuccessfully jumping over a moving rope actually b...oh my LORD have you SEEN THE SKIPPING VIDEO? YOU'VE GOT TO SEE THE SKIPPING VIDEO! THE SKIPPING VIDEO IS AMAZING! .

Track listings

Chart performance

Weekly charts

Year-end charts

Certifications

Release history

References 

2010 singles
DJ Fresh songs
Song recordings produced by DJ Fresh
2010 songs
Songs written by DJ Fresh